Mangloona is a village in Laxmangarh tehsil in Sikar district, Rajasthan. It is situated on Laxmangarh to Salasar Road near the border of Churu district. The village is the birthplace of Swami Keshwanand, a freedom fighter.

References
        List of Villages in Laxmangarh Tehsil

External links
 Census 2001 Sikar District

Villages in Sikar district